Song Oh-kyun (Hangul: 송오균; Hanja: 宋五均; February 28, 1892 – June 20, 1970) was a rice farmer and Korean independence activist who was deeply involved in the Korean Independence Movement in the US. Between 1926 and 1945, he took leading positions in the Korean National Association (KNA), the largest Korean immigrant political organization, founded in February 1909 by Ahn Chang-ho.

Life 

Song Oh-Kyun was born in Pyongyang, Korea, in 1892. In October 1916, he immigrated to the US following his studies in Shanghai. He attended the University of Southern California and received a master's degree in liberal arts. As a student, he was involved in organizations such as the Young Korean Academy (:ko:흥사단), and after graduating in 1926, he joined his older brother Song Yi-kyun in taking various responsibilities within the North American Regional branch of the KNA.

During his years in the KNA, he was involved in both its internal affairs and political activities in the Korean Independence Movement. He began his work in 1927 as a judicial officer in the Sacramento local assembly of the KNA. The following year, he participated in the 19th Delegates' Conference of the General Assembly of the KNA as a deputy delegate of the Los Angeles Local Assembly and then was chosen as a Bill Amendment Committee member. In February 1931, he became a business staff member and in April a Dues Collection Committee member until 1938 when he was selected as a member of the Central Executive Committee of the KNA. In 1943 and 1944, he was an Inspection Committee member of the Los Angeles Local Assembly, and in October 1944, a Central Inspection Committee member of the Central Executive Committee at the 9th Representatives' Convention of the KNA.

After the liberation of Korea from Japanese rule, he remained active in the organization as a Business Committee member in the Los Angeles Local Assembly and a Collections Committee member in the Overseas Ethnic Koreans' Convention. As a member of the KNA, he supported the organization's independence movement fund on several occasions. He would also donate money to support Korean immigrants in other countries, such as Cuba and Mexico.

Legacy 
Following Song Oh-Kyun's death in 1970, the Korean newspaper Sinhan Minbo (신한민보) paid tribute to his decades of work for the Korean National Association. In 2015, the 70th anniversary of Korea's liberation from Japan, he was posthumously awarded the Presidential Commendation Award (대통령표창) by the Republic of Korea for contributing to the interests of the nation. The Song family was officially presented with the award in a ceremony held on January 18, 2019 at the Consulate General of the Republic of Korea in Los Angeles.

See also 

History of Korea
Provisional Government of Republic of Korea
Korean independence movement
Korean National Association
Sinhan Minbo
Song Yi-kyun

References

Bibliography 

국민회 제十九대 의회 [The 19th People’s Congress].(1928 Jan. 12) The New Korea, no.1060. Retrieved from http://db.history.go.kr/item/imageViewer.do?levelId=npsh_1928_01_12_v0001_0010 
 차이나선편에 새로 건너온 동포, 남녀 동포 26인[26 Men and Women Arrive from China].(1916, Oct 5), The New Korea, no.413. Retrieved from http://db.history.go.kr/item/imageViewer.do?levelId=npsh_1916_10_05_v0003_0110 
 중상 회록 초록. (1944 Feb. 24), The New Korea, no. 1874. Retrieved from http://db.history.go.kr/item/imageViewer.do?levelId=npsh_1944_02_24_v0001_0020
 국제부 상조부의 예비금 성산 [Ministry of International Affairs]. (1944 May, 4), The New Korea, no. 1884. Retrieved from http://db.history.go.kr/item/imageViewer.do?levelId=npsh_1944_05_04_v0001_0020  
동포 구제금 [Korean Relief ]. (1922 Feb. 23). The New Korea, no. 781. Retrieved from http://db.history.go.kr/item/imageViewer.do?levelId=npsh_1922_02_23_v0004_0320 
Korean National Association Central and Local Officers (1944), Retrieved from http://digitallibrary.usc.edu/cdm/compoundobject/collection/p15799coll126/id/10827/rec/37  
빌셔와 안장 [Song Oh-Kyun Laid to Rest in Wilshire]. (1970 Feb 26) The New Korea, no.3131. Retrieved from http://digitallibrary.usc.edu/cdm/compoundobject/collection/p15799coll43/id/17629/rec/37 

미주 독립유공자 고 송오균 선생 훈포장 전수식 열려. (2019 Jan 18) Radio Korea News. Retrieved from https://www.radiokorea.com/news/article.php?uid=305914

애국 충정의 그 이름, 잊지 않겠습니다.(2019 Aug. 15) The Korea Daily. Retrieved from http://www.koreadaily.com/news/read.asp?art_id=7514390

1892 births
1970 deaths
Korean emigrants to the United States
People from Pyongyang